The figure skating competition organized by the Icelandic Skating Association as a part of the annual multi sport Reykjavik International Games organized by the Reykjavík Sports Union. Since 2015, it is sanctioned by the International Skating Union. The event is held in January/February at Laugardalur skating rink in Reykjavík, Iceland. Medals may be awarded in men's singles, ladies' singles. Competition in Senior, Junior and Advanced Novice is held according to ISU rules. A non-ISU competition is also held in accordance with Icelandic Skating Association rules.

Senior medalists

Women

Men

Junior medalists

Ladies

Men

Advanced Novice medalists

Ladies

Men

References

External links 
Icelandic Skating Association
Reykjavik Sports Union
Reykjavik International Games

Explanatory footnotes 

Figure skating at multi-sport events
International figure skating competitions hosted by Iceland
Figure skating in Iceland
Sports competitions in Reykjavík